Antoine Schmitt (born 1961 in Strasbourg, France) is a French contemporary artist, programming engineer and designer.

Biography 

Antoine Schmitt was a self-made programmer at the age of 16.

After earning his engineer diploma from the Telecom Paris in 1984, he worked as programming engineer specialised in artificial intelligence and human-machine interactions, in Paris, especially for the company Act Informatique for five years (1985–1991), and in Silicon Valley as an R&D engineer for the NeXT company with Steve Jobs for three years (1991–1994). He has been technical assistant to the film-maker Chris Marker, and collaborated with the companies Hyptique, Incandescence, Virtools, the BBC and more recently with violet. He creates specialised software, especially Xtras (plugins) of Adobe Director, like the asFFT Xtra.

Since 1994, he has worked as a visual artist, recognised by numerous awards and exhibitions. Artist of the movement, digital artist, Schmitt develops his work around the notion of shapes "programmed to be free". His artworks, minimal, abstract and efficient, tackle contemporary or intemporal themes like the condition of being free, the systems of reality or the forces and their shape. He places programming, an artistic medium that he considers as radically new because of its active dimension, at the heart of the majority of his creations. Using techniques coming from artificial life and intelligence, influenced by philosophical and psychoanalytical approaches, Schmitt crafts objects or situations, generative or interactive physical, visual or audio systems, which question the modalities of the free human being in a complex world. Also, alone or though collaborations, Schmitt confronts his approach with more established artistic fields like dance, music, cinema, architecture or literature, and revisits their codes.

In 1995, he publishes "puppetsprite 1", first artistic CD-rom, with the visual artist Alberto Sorbelli.

In 1997, under the pseudo Georges Victor, he launches the olalaParis mailing-list of artistic events, the first, still active, mailing-list of contemporary art in France.

In 1998, he publishes with Jean-Jacques Birgé, "Machiavel", interactive behavioural CD-Rom.

In 1999, he is the author with Vincent Epplay of the "infinite CD for unlimited music", first CD-Rom of generative music.

In 2000, he founds the web portal gratin.org, Groupe de Recherche en Art et Technologies Interactives et/ou Numériques, a reference in programmed art.

In 2003, the company violet handles him the design of the behaviour of the Dal lamp. Since then, he designs the infra-verbal behaviour and the visual languages of all the objects of the violet company: the Nabaztag rabbit, the mir:ror, dal:dal, etc...

In 2004, he launches with Adrian Johnson the sonicobject label, first label of original mobile phone ringtones, gathering 16 contemporary composers and 200 ringtones downloadable under Creative Commons licence.

Selected works 
 1995 : puppetsprite 1, with Alberto Sorbelli, interactive CD-Rom
 1996 : Le Pixel Blanc, minimal behavioural installation
 1998 : Machiavel, with Jean-Jacques Birgé, behavioural CD-Rom, nominated Prix Moebius
 1999 : Les Lignes-mobiles, installation, 1st prize Interférences 2000 (Belfort, France)
 2000 : Avec détermination, installation Net Art – 1st prize video-dance Unesco (Paris), Honorary Mention VIDA5.0 2002 (Madrid)
 2000 : Vexation 1, générative installation, honorary mention in software art at transmediale 2001 (Berlin).
 2001 : Display Pixel, with Vincent Epplay, audio-visual performance
 2002 : nanomachine, custom software musical instrument and audio-visual performance, Honorary Mention CynetArt 2004 (Dresden)
 2004 : puppetpresident, net art
 2005 : Gameplay, interactive contemporary dance, with Anne Holst and Jean-Marc Matos (companie K.Danse)
 2006 : Christ Mourant, installation not interactive
 2006 : Nabaz'mob, opera for 100 smart rabbits, with Jean-Jacques Birgé, Ars Electronica Award of Distinction Digital Musics 2009
 2006 : still living, installations, second prize transmediale.07 2007 (Berlin)
 2007 : Facade Life, in situ installation on architecture
 2008 : TIME SLIP, real time installation

Selected exhibitions 
 Musée d'art contemporain de Lyon (1997)
 Musée d'art moderne de la Ville de Paris (1999)
 transmediale festival, Berlin, (2001, 2003, 2005, 2007, 2009)
 Centre national d'art et de culture Georges-Pompidou, Paris, (2004, 2006)
 Sónar Festival, Barcelona, (2002, 2004, 2005)
 iMal, Bruxelles (2003, 2004, 2007, 2008, 2009)
 Ars Electronica, Linz, (2003, 2009)
 Siana Contemporary Art Center, Italy (2004)
 Villette Numérique, Paris (2004)
 Scopitone Festival, Nantes, France (2004, 2007, 2008)
 Ososphère Festival, Strasbourg, France (2005, 2007, 2008)

Selected awards 
 transmediale.01 (Berlin 2001), honorary mention
 Vida 5.0 (Madrid 2002) : honorary mention
 CYNETArt (Dresden, DE, 2004) : honorary mention
 transmediale.07 (Berlin, DE, 2007) : second prize
 Ars Electronica 2009 (Linz, Austria) : Award of Distinction Digital Musics

References

Bibliography
 (French) De l'Intelligence Artificielle à l'Inconscient Artificiel L'objet petit a : une exposition d'Antoine Schmitt, Franck Renucci et Hervé Zénouda, UFR Ingémédia, Université Toulon Var, Actes du colloque SIANA09, 2009
 (French) Les images et les sons dans les hypermédias artistiques contemporains, Chapitre 5 : Antoine Schmitt, Hervé Zénouda, Éditions L'Harmattan, Paris, France, 2008
 (French) Schmitt et Birgé, des lapins communicants, Françis Marmande – Le Monde, 19sept07
 (French) Du pinceau à la souris, Olivier Le Floc'h – La Tribune – 2mar07
 (French) L'art programmé selon Antoine Schmitt, Dominique Moulon, Images Magazine Mensuel, mars 2006
 (French) Article sur la nanomachine, Marie Lechner, Libération, 2003
 (German) article sur avec determination, Die Tageszeitung, 2000

Sources
 (French) Video interview Magnetic Room Magazine, 2008
 (Italian) article on Gameplay, Neural.it, 2005
 (French) Nanomachine, une performance autonome, visuelle et sonore sur écran, Marie Beloeil, transfert.net, 2003
 (English) Article and Interview on turbulence.org, Jim Andrews, 2003
 (French) Le travail du temps : programmer un mode d'être, Samuel Bianchini, Parpaings n°32, Éd. Jean-Michel Place, Paris, avril 2002
 (English) Interview, Jose Luis de Vicente, SonarOnLine, 2002

External links
 Official Site of Antoine Schmitt

French contemporary artists
French digital artists
French installation artists
Living people
1961 births